Boarmia driophila is a moth of the family Geometridae first described by G. M. Goldfinch in 1944. It is found in Australia.

References

Boarmiini
Moths of Australia
Moths described in 1944